The Garden of Forgiveness (also known as Hadiqat As-Samah in Arabic) is a garden in Beirut, close to Martyrs’ Square and the wartime Green Line (1975-1990).

History
The area was classified as non aedificandi (Latin for "not to be built"), in the Master Plan of the Beirut City Center.

British-Lebanese citizen Alexandra Asseily first came up with the idea for the garden in 1998 as a response to the Lebanese Civil War. In 1998, the winning design of Gustafson Porter was chosen for its construction. The design brought together different aspects of Lebanon’s ancient heritage and rich landscapes, emphasizing national unity.

Excavations on the site revealed the two main streets of the Roman city of Berytus, the Cardo and Decumanus Maximus, and, underneath them, a sacred platform dating from Phoenico-Persian times.

Construction on the site by Beirut redevelopment company Solidere began in 2003.

In 2006, the construction of the garden was placed on hold due to the 2006 Lebanon War. It remains on hold as of 2019.

Location
The garden is surrounded by places of worship belonging to different denominations.

See also
 Place de l'Étoile

References

Further reading
 Curvers, Hans H. and Stuart, Barbara (2007) “The BCD Archaeology Project, 2000-2006”, Bulletin d’Archéologie et d’Architecture Libanaises 9: 189-221.
 Hadiqat as-Samah (2000) Brochure Solidere, Beirut.
 Saghieh-Beydoun, Muntaha, ‘Allam, Mahmoud, ‘Ala’Eddine, Abdallah and Abulhosn, Sana (1998-9) “The Monumental Street ‘Cardo Maximus’ and the Replanning of Roman Berytus”, Bulletin d’Archéologie et d’Architecture Libanaises 3:95-126.

External links
 Plans and descriptions, Gustafson Porter + Bowman

Gardens in Lebanon
Parks in Lebanon
Urban public parks
Parks and gardens in Beirut